Renuncio is a village of the province of Burgos, in the autonomous community of Castile and León, Spain.

It has 99 inhabitants, and it is near Burgos. The local economy is primarily based on agriculture

Town Holidays: San Antón Abad (January 17) and Santa Catalina.

References

External links
Renuncio website 

Municipalities in the Province of Burgos